The 1993 North Alabama Lions football team represented the University of North Alabama during the 1993 NCAA Division II football season, and completed the 61st season of Lions football. The Lions played their home games at Braly Municipal Stadium in Florence Alabama. The 1993 team came off an 8–4–1 record and a quarterfinal loss from the previous season. The team was led by coach Bobby Wallace. The team finished the regular season with an undefeated 10–0 record and made the NCAA Division II playoffs. The Lions defeated the  41–34 in the National Championship Game en route to the program's first NCAA Division II Football Championship.

References

North Alabama
North Alabama Lions football seasons
NCAA Division II Football Champions
Gulf South Conference football champion seasons
College football undefeated seasons
North Alabama Lions football